Puerto Gaitán Airport  is an airport serving the river town of Puerto Gaitán in the Meta Department of Colombia.

See also

Transport in Colombia
List of airports in Colombia

References

External links
OpenStreetMap - Puerto Gaitán
OurAirports - Puerto Gaitán
Puerto Gaitán Airport

Airports in Colombia